One Second may refer to:

 One Second (film), a 2020 film
 One Second (Yello album), 1987
 One Second (Paradise Lost album), 1997, or the title track
 "One Second", a song by Stormzy from his 2019 album Heavy Is the Head